Human rights in Islam may refer to:
 Human Rights in Islam (book), a 1976 book by Sayyid Abul Ala Maududi, the founder of Jamaat-e-Islami
 Human rights in Islam (speech), a 1987 speech by Ayatollah Ali Khamenei

See also
 Human rights in Islamic countries
 The Cairo Declaration on Human Rights in Islam
 Arab Charter on Human Rights
 Pact of Umar